
Stillman House (1950) follows Marcel Breuer’s Gregory Ain demonstration “House in the Garden” built the year before for the MOMA Museum, which now sits at the Rockefeller Kykuit estate in Hudson Valley, NY.  The Stillman house boasts three separate architectural commissions by Breuer between 1950-1953: a main house, a studio, and pool and porch redesign, with the latter featuring an 18’x10’ pool mural wall by friend and sculptor, Alexander Calder.  During this time, fellow first-generation Bauhaus friend and artist, Xanti Schawinsky, executed an interior mural wall as well.

Stillman house sits adjacent the Huvelle House (1953) by John M. Johansen and together, they represent the first and second modern homes in Litchfield, Connecticut, existing between a forest reserve and the town’s historic North Street.  In 1953, the Stillmans decided to split their 6-acre property in two, inviting the Huvelles to join their modern experience on the condition their choice of architect was to remain modern.  John Johansen, fellow Harvard Five architect and student and associate of Breuer, built the adjacent home.  The house is a study in simple form, natural light, and thoughtful design.  It also sits in complementary juxtaposition to the Stillman House in appreciation of its patterned use of glass, primary color panels and pool mural. 
 
Although Stillman House was the beginning of a client-architect friendship and collaboration that spanned 30 plus years, the house serves as important reminder to what creative thinking and out-of-town influence can do.  To date, and in reaction to these homes, the Borough of Litchfield restricts the further use of modern design within its borough’s historic boundaries as protection to its Colonial and Greek Revival heritage.  Nevertheless, what has become clear to everyone familiar with these homes is just how complementary and special they have become in telling the history of Litchfield’s architectural heritage.  The 6-acre property is now reunited, and the homes are fully restored to their original detail.

Sources and further information

Stillman House
Syracuse University: Marcel Breuer Files:"Stillman House"
Smithsonian Institution and Archives of American Art (with Alexander Calder Mural Wall): " Stillman House in Marcel Breuer Files"
Gregory Ain "House in Garden" Exhibit for Moma "Gregory Ain "House in Garden"
The Making of a New England Town: "The Making of a New England Town"
New York Times: "In Our Time"
do.co.mo.mo International Publication: "In Our Time, Page 9"
Correspondence between Rufus and Leslie Stillman and Marcel Breuer (60 letters) at the Smithsonian Institution and Archives of American Art: "Marcel Breuer papers, 1920-1986"
Litchfield Historic Society, "In Our Own Time: Modern Architecture in Litchfield: 1949-1970"
Maquette for pool mural "Litchfield Historical Society"

Marcel Breuer
 Site:"Biographical data and resources"
 Selected works: "Timeline"

Marcel Breuer buildings
Modernist architecture in Connecticut
Houses completed in 1951